Line H is a line of the Buenos Aires Underground. The first phase, between Plaza Once and Caseros, which opened on 18 October 2007, currently stretches over 8.8 km between Hospitales and Facultad de Derecho stations. It is the first entirely new line built in Buenos Aires since the opening of Line E on 20 June 1944.

According to projections, the line will stretch a total of about 11.85 km and will run from between Retiro to Sáenz once the remaining sections are constructed. It connects the southern part of the city with the north, improving traffic flow to the centre of the city. It is also designed to serve as a transversal line and provide cross-connections across all radial lines, mainly under the axis of Jujuy and Pueyrredón avenues.

Rolling stock 

During its early years, Line H was served by a temporary fleet of refurbished and original vintage Siemens-Schuckert Orenstein & Koppel train sets originally introduced on line C, with electric current supplied by overhead lines. The cars featured 42 seats and 4 doors per side.

As the line was extended and passenger numbers increased, the rolling stock was replaced by new Alsom 300 Series units ordered from that company in 2012 in order to make up the entirety of the Line's rolling stock. The first 6 of the 120 new Alstom cars arrived In August 2015, with the remainder phased-in as the line has been extended.

Further expansion

An initial extension to Corrientes station was inaugurated on Monday 6 December 2010. The Córdoba and Las Heras stations opened in December 2015 with Santa Fe station (which links Line H to Line D) opening in April 2016.  Alstom Metropolis rolling stock is now being used on the line.  

The Facultad de Derecho station (located at the University of Buenos Aires Faculty of Law) was originally intended to be located across the road next to Plaza Francia, however concerns that it would damage the prestigious Recoleta Cemetery necessitated revisions to these plans and therefore delayed construction of the station, which eventually opened in May 2018. The final stretch to Retiro is not set to open until some time after the revision of the route following the relocation of the Plaza Francia station.

Chronology

Gallery

References

External links 

 Subterráneos de Buenos Aires (Official Page)
 Metrovías S.A. Subte Operator (Official Page)
 Subterráneos de Buenos Aires, H Line
 System map

Buenos Aires Underground
Railway lines opened in 2007
Buenos Aires – Line H